Varmiyeh (also Romanized as Varmīyeh; also known as Varmīneh and Vīrmeh) is a village in Masal Rural District, in the Central District of Masal County, Gilan Province, Iran. At the 2006 census, its population was 307, in 86 families.

References 

Populated places in Masal County
Rural Districts of Gilan Province